20th Century Masters – The Millennium Collection: The Best of George Strait is a collection of some of George Strait's greatest hits. It was released in March 26, 2002 by MCA Nashville.

Critical reception

20th Century Masters – The Millennium Collection: The Best of George Strait received three out of five stars from William Ruhlmann of Allmusic. In his review, Ruhlmann notes some of Strait's biggest hits are included while others are absent.

Commercial performance
20th Century Masters – The Millennium Collection: The Best of George Strait peaked at number 8 on the U.S. Billboard Top Country Albums chart. It also reached number 76 on the all-genre Billboard 200.

The album was certified Gold by the RIAA on September 30, 2003, and Platinum on July 29, 2005. It has sold 1,836,000 copies as October 2019.

Track listing

Charts

Weekly charts

Year-end charts

Certifications

References

Albums produced by Jimmy Bowen
Strait, George
2002 greatest hits albums
George Strait compilation albums
MCA Records compilation albums
Albums produced by Ray Baker (music producer)